The Sacrae Cantiones of Carlo Gesualdo da Venosa are two collections of motets published in 1603. The first volume consists of 19 motets for 5 voices, the second volume of 20 motets for 6 or 7 voices. The bassus and sextus (sixth part) of the second volume are lost, but were reconstructed by musicologist James Wood from 2008 to 2011 and recorded by Wood's Vocalconsort Berlin in August 2011.

Motet list
Sacrarum cantionum quinque vocibus Liber primus, Napoli, Costantino Vitale, 1603
 O vos omnes 
 Domine, ne despicias deprecationem meam
 Sancti Spiritus, Domine
 Exaudi, Deus, deprecationem meam
 Venit lumen tuum
 Illumina faciem tuam
 Maria, Mater gratiae
 Precibus et meritis
 Ave, dulcissima Maria
 Dignare me laudare te
Ave Regina cœlorum
Hei mihi Domine
Tribulationem et dolorem
Peccantem me quotidie
Reminiscere miserationum tuarum
Tribularer si nescirem
Laboravi in gemitu meo
Deus, refugium et virtus
O Crux benedicta

Sacrarum cantionum liber primus, 1603 - in fact Liber secundus
Ad te levavi
Adoramus te Christe
Ardens est cor meum 
Assumpta est Maria
Ave sanctissima Maria
Da pacem Domine 
Discedite a me omnes
Franciscus humilis et pauper
Gaudeamus omnes 
Illumina nos
Ne derelinquas me 
O anima sanctissima 
O beata Mater 
O oriens splendor
O sacrum convivium 
Sana me Domine 
Veni Creator Spiritus
Veni sponsa Christi
Verba mea
Virgo benedicta

Editions
 Eight songs of the Sacrae Cantiones arranged/completed  by Theo Verbey in 2005.

Recordings
 Book 1 Odhecaton, Ensemble Mare Nostrum dir. Paolo Da Col 2013
 Book 2 Vocalconsort Berlin, dir. James Wood 2011

References

1603 works
Compositions by Carlo Gesualdo